Leonard A. Schmidtner, born Leonard Kowalski, was a Polish architect who moved to Milwaukee, Wisconsin and designed the former Milwaukee County Courthouse, a clock tower for Holy Trinity Church (1862) on South Fourth and West Bruce Streets, and St. Stanislaus Catholic Church He was one of the first Poles in the city and spoke German and adopted the name Schmidtner to help establish himself.

Projects
 Davis Dry goods store (1860)
 clock tower for Holy Trinity Church Roman Catholic Church (Milwaukee) (added 1862) at 605 South 4th Street and West Bruce Street. Building is listed on the National Register of Historic Places.
 St. Stanislaus Catholic Church at 1681 South 5th Street in Milwaukee (renovated 1962 and gold leaf applied to domes).
 former Milwaukee County Courthouse

References

19th-century Polish architects
Architects from Milwaukee
Polish emigrants to the United States
Year of death missing
Year of birth missing